This article is a comprehensive list of all the actual possessions of the Portuguese Empire.

Europe 
Portuguese founded factories in various places in Europe, with a purely commerce-focused strategy, different from the other continents.

 Antwerp - factory 
 Bruges - factory
 Chios - factory (founded in 1499 - ?)
 Venice - factory (c. 1508)

Africa
Portuguese presence in Africa started in 1415 with the conquest of Ceuta and is generally viewed as ending in 1975, with the independence of its later colonies, although the present autonomous region of Madeira is located in the African Plate, some 650 km (360 mi) off the North African coast, Madeira belongs and has always belonged ethnically, culturally, economically and politically to Europe, some 955 km (583 mi) from the European mainland.

 Angola/Portuguese West Africa: colony (1575–1589); crown colony (1589–1951); overseas province (1951–1971); state (1971–1975). Independence in 1975.
 Arguin/Arguim: (1455–1633)
 Accra: (1557–1578)
 Cabinda: protectorate (1883–1887); Congo district (1887–1921); intendancy subordinate to Maquela (1921–1922); dependency of Zaire district (1922–1930); Intendacy of Zaire and Cabinda (1930–1932); intendancy under Portuguese Angola (1932–1934); dependency under Angola (1934–1945); restored as District (1946–1975). Controlled by Frente Nacional para a Libertação de Angola (National Liberation Front of Angola) as part of independent Angola in 1975. Declared Cabinda a republic in 1975, but not recognized by Portugal nor Angola.
 Cabo Verde/Cape Verde: settlements (1462–1495); dominion of crown colonies (1495–1587); crown colony (1587–1951); overseas province (1951–1974); autonomous republic (1974–1975). Independence in 1975.

 Ceuta: possession (1415–1640). Ceded to Spain in 1668.
 Elmina: possession (1482–1637). Captured by the Dutch West Indies Company.
 Fernando Pó and Annobón: colonies (1474–1778). Ceded to Spain in 1778.
 Portuguese Gold Coast: (1482–1642), ceded to Dutch Gold Coast in 1642
 Guiné Portuguesa/Portuguese Guinea: colony (1879–1951); overseas province (1951–1974). Unilateral independence declared in 1973, recognized by Portugal in 1974.
 Cacheu: captaincy (1640–1879). United with Bissau in 1879.
 Bissau: settlement under Cacheu (1687–1696); captaincy (1696–1707); abandoned (1707–1753); separate colony under Cape Verde (1753–1879). United with Cacheu in 1879.
 Madagascar: southern part (1496–1550)
 Madeira: possession (1418–1420); colony (1420–1580); crown colony (1580–1834); autonomous district (1834–1976). Made an autonomous region in 1976.
 Mascarene Islands: fortified post (1498–1540)
 Malindi: occupation (1500–1630)
 Mombassa: occupation (1593–1638); colony subordinate to Goa, capital of Portuguese India (1638–1698; 1728–1729). Under Omani sovereignty in 1729.
 Morocco enclaves
 Aguz/Souira Guedima (1506–1525)
 Alcácer Ceguer/El Qsar es Seghir (1458–1550)
 Arzila/Asilah (1471–1550; 1577–1589). Restored to Morocco in 1589.
 Azamor/Azemmour (1513–1541). City restored to Morocco in 1541.
 Mazagan/El Jadida (1485–1550); possession (1506–1769). Incorporation into Morocco in 1769.
 Mogador/Essaouira (1506–1510)
 Safim/Safi (1488–1541)
 Santa Cruz do Cabo de Gué/Agadir (1505–1541)
 Moçambique/Portuguese East Africa: possession (1498–1501); subordinate to Goa (1501–1569); captaincy-general (1569–1609); colony subordinate to Goa (1609–1752); colony (1752–1951); overseas province (1951–1971); state (1971–1974); local transitional administration (1974–1975). Independence in 1975.
 Ouadane (1487)
 Quíloa (1505–1512)
 Rokupr: possession (it was under the Portuguese c. 1778)
 São João Baptista de Ajudá: colonial fort (1680-c.1700); fort subordinate to the Portuguese colony of Brazil (1721–1730); fort administered by colonial governor (1730-1858) subordinate to Portuguese São Tomé and Príncipe (1865–1869). Fort re-established under separate administration (1872-1961). Annexed by Dahomey in 1961.
 São Tomé and Príncipe/São Tomé e Príncipe: crown colony (1753–1951); overseas province (1951–1971); local administration (1971–1975). Independence in 1975.
 São Tomé: possession (1470–1485); colony (1485–1522); crown colony (1522–1641); administration under Dutch occupation (1641–1648). French occupation in 1648.
 Príncipe: colony (1471–1753). United with São Tomé in 1753.
 Tangier: possession (1471–1662). Ceded to England in 1662.
 Zanzibar: possession (1503–1698). Became part of Oman in 1698.
 Ziguinchor: possession (1645–1888). Ceded to France in 1888.

Asia-Pacific
India was reached by the Portuguese in 1498 by Vasco da Gama. Macau was the last possession in Asia and was handed over to the People's Republic of China in 1999.

 Aden: Attempted conquest by Albuquerque (1513) and Albergaria (1516). Occupied for a few months in 1547–1548 before being recaptured by Piri Reis
 Bahrain: possession (1521–1602). Driven out by a native revolt and occupied by Persian troops.
 Ceylon: colony (1597–1658). Dutch took control in 1656, Jaffna taken in 1658.
 Flores Island: possession (16th-19th century). Sold the island to the Dutch East Indies.
 Solor: possession (1520–1636)
 Gamru/Bandar Abbas: possession (1506–1615). Conquered by Persian forces.
 Hormuz/Ormuz: possession subordinate to Goa (1515–1622). Captured by a joint force between the Persia and the English East India Company.
 Laccadive Islands/Lakshadweep (1498–1545). Driven out by its native inhabitants.
 Macau/Macao: settlement (1553–1557), leased territory subordinated to Goa (1557–1844); overseas province (1844–1883); combined overseas province with Portuguese Timor under Goa (1883–1951); overseas province (1951–1976); Autonomous region (1976–1999). Returned to full sovereignty of the People's Republic of China as a special administrative region in 1999.
 Coloane: occupation in 1864
 Taipa: occupation in 1851
 Ilha Verde: incorporated in 1890
 D. João, Lapa and Montanha Islands: settled by Portuguese missionaries in the 19th century; occupation by Portuguese troops in 1938. Taken in 1941 by the Empire of Japan and restored to China in 1945.
 Makassar (1512–1665); lost to the Dutch
 Malacca: settlement (1511–1641); lost to the Dutch
 Maldives: possession (1518–1521, 1558–1573) 
 Maluku Islands (see Portuguese Insulíndia) 
 Amboina/Ambon: settlement (1576–1605)
 Ternate: settlement (1522–1575)
 Tidore: colony (1578–1605). Seized by Dutch in 1605.

 Muscat: possession (1515–1650)
 Índia Portuguesa/Portuguese India: overseas province (1946–1962). Taken over by India in 1962 and recognised by Portugal in 1974.
Baçaim/Vasai: possession (1535–1739)
 Bombaím/Mumbai: possession (1534–1661)
 Calicut/Kozhikode: settlement (1512–1525)
 Cambay/Khambhat: factory (?-1616)
 Cannanore/Kolathunadu: possession (1502–1663)
 Chaul: possession (1521–1740)
 Chittagong: possession (1528–1666)
 Cochin/Kochi: possession (1500–1663)
 Cranganore/Kodungallur: possession (1536–1662)
 Damão/Daman: acquisition in 1559. Became part of overseas province in 1946. Taken over by India in Dec 1961.
 Diu: acquisition in 1535. Became part of overseas province in 1946. Taken over by India in Dec 1961.
 Dadra: acquisition in 1779. Taken over by India in 1954.
 Goa: colony (1510–1946). Became part of overseas province in 1946. Taken over by India in Dec 1961.
 Hughli/Hugli: possession (1579–1632)
 Nagar Haveli: acquisition in 1779. Taken over by India in 1954.
 Masulipatnam/Machilipatnam (1598–1610)
 Thanlyin: possession (1599–1613)
 Mangalore (1568–1659)
 Negapatam/Nagapattinam (1507–1657)
 Paliacate/Pulicat (1518–1610). Occupied by the Dutch in 1610.
 Coulão/Kollam: possession (1502–1661)
 Salsette Island: possession (1534–1737). Conquered by the Marathas.
 São Tomé de Meliapore/Mylapore: settlement (1523–1662; 1687–1749)
 Surat: settlement (1540–1612)
 Tuticorin/Thoothukudi (1548–1658)
 Socotra: possession (1506–1511). Became part of Mahri Sultanate of Qishn and Suqutra
 Qatar: possession (1517–1538). Lost to the Ottomans
 Timor: claimed and partially possessed from 1520 to 1640.
West Timor: part of Timor lost to the Dutch in 1640.
Portuguese Timor: colony subordinate to Portuguese India (1642–1844); subordinate to Macau (1844–1896); separate colony (1896–1951); overseas territory (1951–1975); republic and unilateral independence proclaimed, annexed by Indonesia (1975–1999, UN recognition as Portuguese territory). UN administration from 1999 until independence in 2002.

Latin America

Brazil was explored and claimed in 1500, and become independent in 1822. Unlike the Spanish, the Portuguese did not divide their possession in South America in several vice-royalties.

 Barbados: Possession known as Os Barbados, discovered by Pedro Campos between 1532 and 1536. The only Caribbean possession the Portuguese ever held, until Portugal abandoned the island in 1620 to continue exploring nearby Brazil.
 Brazil: possession known as Ilha de Santa Cruz, later Terra de Vera Cruz (1500–1530); colony (1530–1714); vice-kingdom (1714–1815); kingdom united with the Kingdom of Portugal (1815–1822), independence in 1822.
 Cisplatina (Uruguay): occupation (1808–1822). Captaincy in 1817 (of the United Kingdom of Portugal, Brazil and the Algarves). Adhered as a province of the new Empire of Brazil in 1822. Became independent 1827, changing its name to Uruguay.
 French Guiana: occupation (1809–1817). Restored to France in 1817.
 Nova Colónia do Sacramento: colony in present Uruguay (1680; 1683–1705; 1715–1777). Ceded to the Spanish Empire in 1777.

North Atlantic and Northern America

The Azores were discovered early in the Discovery Ages. Labrador and Corte-Real brothers later explored and claimed Greenland and eastern modern Canada from 1499 to 1502.

 Azores: colonies (1427–1766); captaincy-general (1766–1831); autonomous districts of Angra do Heroismo, Horta and Ponta Delgada (1831–1976). Made an autonomous region in 1976.
 Greenland: (1499/1500–?) possession claimed by João Fernandes Labrador in 1499 or 1500. Seen as claimed in the Cantino planisphere of 1502, Reinel-Lopo Homem chart of 1519 and Reinel map of 1535.
 Land of the Corte-Real: (1501–?) claimed after the voyages of the Corte-Real brothers. Portuguese had two settlements in Newfoundland, one in Portugal Cove - St. Philips and the other in Portugal Cove South.
 Terra Nova (Newfoundland): (1501–?) claimed by Miguel and Gaspar Corte-Real, latter by João Álvares Fagundes. Also known as Terra Nova dos Bacalhaus (New Land of Codfish).
 Labrador (1499/1500–?): claimed by the Corte-Real brothers and maybe by João Fernandes Labrador.
 Nova Scotia (1519?–?): explored and claimed by João Álvares Fagundes. In Nova Scotia, Portuguese had two settlements, one in Saint Peters and another one in Ingonish.

See also

European colonization of the Americas
History of Portugal
History of Portugal (1415–1578)
Timeline of Portuguese history

References

Further reading
 Cotton, James. East Timor, Australia and regional order: intervention and its aftermath in Southeast Asia (Routledge, 2004).
 De Meneses, Filipe Ribeiro, and Robert McNamara, eds. The White Redoubt, the Great Powers and the Struggle for Southern Africa, 1960-1980 (Palgrave Macmillan UK, 2017).
 James, W. Martin. Historical dictionary of Angola (Rowman & Littlefield, 2018).
 Lloyd-Jones, Stewart, and António Costa Pinto, eds. The last Empire: thirty years of Portuguese decolonization (Intellect Books, 2003).
 MacQueen, Norrie. The Decolonization of Portuguese Africa: Metropolitan Revolution and the Dissolution of Empire (1997).
 MacQueen, Norrie. "Belated Decolonization and UN Politics against the Backdrop of the Cold War: Portugal, Britain, and Guinea-Bissau's Proclamation of Independence, 1973–1974." Journal of Cold War Studies 8.4 (2006): 29–56.
 Springhall, John. Decolonization since 1945: the collapse of European overseas empires (Palgrave Macmillan, 2001).

 
1415 establishments in Europe
1999 disestablishments in Portugal
Portuguese
15th-century establishments in Portugal